
Year 468 (CDLXVIII) was a leap year starting on Monday (link will display the full calendar) of the Julian calendar. At the time, it was known as the Year of the Consulship of Anthemius without colleague (or, less frequently, year 1221 Ab urbe condita). The denomination 468 for this year has been used since the early medieval period, when the Anno Domini calendar era became the prevalent method in Europe for naming years.

Events 
 By place 

 Roman Empire 
 Emperor Leo I assembles a massive naval expedition at Constantinople, which costs 64,000 pounds of gold (more than a year's revenue) and consists of over 1,100 ships carrying 100,000 men. It is the greatest fleet ever sent against the Vandals and brings Leo near to bankruptcy.
 Emperor Anthemius sends a Roman expedition under command of Marcellinus. He expels the Vandals from Sicily and retakes Sardinia. The Eastern general Heraclius of Edessa lands with a force on the Libyan coast, east of Carthage, and advances from Tripolitania.
 Battle of Cape Bon: The Vandals defeat the Roman navy under Basiliscus, anchored at Promontorium Mercurii, 45 miles from Carthage (Tunisia). During peace negotiations Genseric uses fire ships, filling them with brushwood and pots of oil, destroying 700 imperial galleys. Basiliscus escapes with his surviving fleet to Sicily, harassed all the way by Moorish pirates.
 August – Marcellinus is murdered in Sicily, probably at the instigation of his political rival, Ricimer. Heraclius is left to fight alone against the Vandals; after a 2-year campaign in the desert he returns to Constantinople.
 Basiliscus returns to Constantinople after a disastrous expedition against the Vandals. He is forced to seek sanctuary in the church of Hagia Sophia to escape the wrath of the people. Leo I gives him imperial pardon, but banishes him for 3 years to Heraclea Sintica (Thrace).
 Dengizich, son of Attila the Hun, sends an embassy to Constantinople to demand money. Leo I offers the Huns settlement in Thrace in exchange for recognition of his authority. Dengizich refuses and crosses the Danube.
 Roman forces under Anagast defeat the Huns at the river Utus (Vit, Bulgaria). Dengizich is killed and his head is paraded through the streets of Constantinople. Stuck on the end of a wooden pole, it is displayed above the Xylokerkos Gate.
 The Vandals reconquer Sicily, administering a decisive defeat to the Western forces.

 By topic 

 Religion 
 February 29 – Pope Hilarius dies at Rome after a 6½-year reign, and is succeeded by Simplicius as the 47th pope.

Births 
 Nectan of Hartland, Welsh prince and saint (approximate date)

Deaths 
 February 29, – Pope Hilarius
 Dengizich, king of the Huns (approximate date)
 Gunabhadra, Indian Buddhist scholar-monk (b. 394)
 Marcellinus, Roman general (magister militum)

References